Volcan Rumoka, also known as Rumoka and Le Rumoka, is a cinder cone volcano in the Virunga Mountains in Nord Kivu, Democratic Republic of the Congo (formerly known as Zaire). The volcano is a minor satellite cone on the flanks of the massive shield volcano of  Nyamuragira. It is located about 16 km (10 mi) south of Nyamuragira's caldera.

Rumoka last erupted between 1912 and 1913. In December 1912, lava began to flow from the volcano, continuing until March 1913. In February 1913, Nyamuragira also erupted, prompting speculation that the two were affecting one another in some manner.

References

External links
 

Volcanoes of the Democratic Republic of the Congo
Cinder cones